Yarino is a rural locality (a village) and the administrative center of Nikolskoye Rural Settlement, Karagaysky District, Perm Krai, Russia. The population was 350 as of 2010. There are 8 streets.

Geography 
Yarino is located on the Bolshaya Niya River, 14 km northeast of Karagay (the district's administrative centre) by road. Gudyri is the nearest rural locality.

References 

Rural localities in Karagaysky District